Matara electoral district is one of the 22 multi-member electoral districts of Sri Lanka created by the 1978 Constitution of Sri Lanka. The district is conterminous with the administrative district of Matara in the Southern province. The district currently elects 8 of the 225 members of the Sri Lankan Parliament and had 578,858 registered electors in 2010.

1982 Presidential Election
Results of the 1st presidential election held on 20 October 1982 for the district:

1988 Presidential Election
Results of the 2nd presidential election held on 19 December 1988 for the district:

1989 Parliamentary General Election
Results of the 9th parliamentary election held on 15 February 1989 for the district:

The following candidates were elected:
Gamini Fonseka (UNP), 19,618 preference votes (pv); Mahinda Wijesekara (SLFP), 18,517 pv; Mangala Samaraweera (SLFP), 11,971 pv; Ranjan Wijayawardhana (UNP), 9,925 pv; Abeywardhana Dayananda Wickremasinghe (UNP), 9,579 pv; Madurapala Ediriweera (UNP), 8,562 pv; H. R Piyasiri (UNP), 8,446 pv; Hewagampolage Sirisena (SLFP), 8,212 pv; and Peter Silva Loku Galappaththy (UNP), 7,094 pv.

1993 Provincial Council Election
Results of the 2nd Southern provincial council election held on 17 May 1993 for the district:

1994 Provincial Council Election
Results of the 3rd Southern provincial council election held on 24 March 1994 for the district:

1994 Parliamentary General Election
Results of the 10th parliamentary election held on 16 August 1994 for the district:

The following candidates were elected:
Dullas Alahapperuma (PA), 76,678 preference votes (pv); Ronnie de Mel (UNP), 66,563 pv; Mahinda Wijesekara (PA), 65,769 pv; Chandrasiri Gajadeera (PA), 62,852 pv; Mangala Samaraweera (PA), 61,574 pv; Eugin Alwis Samarasinghe (PA), 57,455 pv; Lakshman Yapa Abeywardena (UNP), 52,294 pv; and Handunneththi Rannulu Wimalasiri (UNP), 33,078 pv.

1994 Presidential Election
Results of the 3rd presidential election held on 9 November 1994 for the district:

1999 Provincial Council Election
Results of the 4th Southern provincial council election held on 10 June 1999 for the district:

1999 Presidential Election
Results of the 4th presidential election held on 21 December 1999 for the district:

2000 Parliamentary General Election
Results of the 11th parliamentary election held on 10 October 2000 for the district:

The following candidates were elected:
Mangala Samaraweera (PA), 93,110 preference votes (pv); Mahinda Wijesekara (PA), 83,625 pv; Lakshman Yapa Abeywardena (UNP), 81,053 pv; Mahinda Yapa Abeywardena (PA), 70,091 pv; Sagala Ratnayaka (UNP), 58,634 pv; Dullas Alahapperuma (PA), 48,721 pv; Chandrasiri Gajadeera (PA), 43,913 pv; and Jinadasa Kitulagoda (JVP), 4,012 pv.

2001 Parliamentary General Election
Results of the 12th parliamentary election held on 5 December 2001 for the district:

The following candidates were elected:
Mangala Samaraweera (PA), 105,992 preference votes (pv); Mahinda Wijesekara (UNF), 95,378 pv; Lakshman Yapa Abeywardena (UNF), 81,617 pv; Mahinda Yapa Abeywardena (PA), 64,756 pv; Justin Galappathi (UNF), 60,548 pv; Mallika de Mel (PA), 60,531 pv; Sagala Ratnayaka (UNF), 55,423 pv; and Jinadasa Kitulagoda (JVP), 4,799 pv.

2004 Parliamentary General Election
Results of the 13th parliamentary election held on 2 April 2004 for the district:

The following candidates were elected:
Mangala Samaraweera (UPFA-SLFP), 118,848 preference votes (pv); Jinadasa Kitulagoda (UPFA-JVP), 109,417 pv; Pemasiri Manage (UPFA-JVP), 101,558 pv; Mahinda Wijesekara (UNF-UNP), 72,563 pv; Lakshman Yapa Abeywardena (UNF-UNP), 66,498 pv; Mahinda Yapa Abeywardena (UPFA-SLFP), 60,453 pv; Sagala Ratnayaka (UNF-UNP), 59,888 pv; and Chandrasiri Gajadeera (UPFA-CPSL), 46,138 pv.

2004 Provincial Council Election
Results of the 5th Southern provincial council election held on 10 July 2004 for the district:

The following candidates were elected:
Akalanka Buddika Pathirana (UNP), 44,165 preference votes (pv); S. Rathanayake (UPFA), 42,771 pv; Justin Galappaththi (UNP), 31,953 pv; Arachchige Saman Kumara Suraweera (UPFA), 29,813 pv; L. B. Lal Premanath (UPFA), 29,790 pv; N. K. Sisira Kumara (UPFA), 29,064 pv; Gunasekara Wickramarathna Hemal (UPFA), 29,021 pv; S. Vijaya Bindu Weerasinghe (UPFA), 26,270 pv; Dhamvijaya Wijesekara Dahanayake (UPFA), 25,174 pv; Abewickrama Danvas Stanly (UPFA), 25,057 pv; Handunneththi Rannulu Piyasiri (UPFA), 24,841 pv; Weerasumana Weerasinghe (UPFA), 22,095 pv; Suduweli Kondage Lakmal Nilantha (UPFA), 19,192 pv; Handunge Sosindra Nandana (UPFA), 18,422 pv; Sirisena Wijewickrama Kankanamge (UNP), 17,878 pv; Kapila Jayantha Wellappili (UNP), 14,620 pv; Amaraweera Wickrama Gunawardhana Jinadasa (UNP), 11,122 pv; and Madduma Patabandige Praneeth Padmathilaka (UNP), 9,312 pv.

2005 Presidential Election
Results of the 5th presidential election held on 17 November 2005 for the district:

2009 Provincial Council Election
Results of the 6th Southern provincial council election held on 10 October 2009 for the district:

The following candidates were elected:
Gunasekara Wickramarathna Hemal (UPFA), 63,323 preference votes (pv); Akalanka Buddika Pathirana (UNP), 57,802 pv; Abeywardhana Sarath Yapa (UPFA), 45,882 pv; Chandima Rasaputhra (UPFA), 40,066 pv; Dhamvijaya Wijesekara Dahanayake (UPFA), 32,972 pv; S. Vijaya Bindu Weerasinghe (UPFA), 32,041 pv; Weerasumana Weerasinghe (UPFA), 31,945 pv; Anthonige Hewa Piyasena (UPFA), 31,423 pv; Manoj Sirisena Hewagampalage (UPFA), 31,033 pv; Kanchana Wodatha Wijesekara (UPFA), 30,870 pv; Jayantha Kodithuwakku Hewa Kodithuwakku Manamalarachchige (UPFA), 29,282 pv; Justin Galappaththi (UPFA), 28,371 pv; Aruna Gunarathna (UPFA), 28,239 pv; Gayan Sanjeewa Hewa Wellalage (UNP), 17,654 pv; Kapila Jayantha Wellappili (UNP), 15,041 pv; Sirisena Wijewickrama Kankanamge (UNP), 14,274 pv; A. A. Haputhanthrige Windana Nishantha (UNP), 13,758 pv; and N. K. Sisira Kumara (JVP), 3,189 pv.

2010 Presidential Election
Results of the 6th presidential election held on 26 January 2010 for the district:

2010 Parliamentary General Election
Results of the 14th parliamentary election held on 8 April 2010 for the district:

The following candidates were elected:
Sanath Jayasuriya (UPFA), 74,352 preference votes (pv); Mahinda Yapa Abeywardena (UPFA-SLFP), 70,439 pv; Lakshman Yapa Abeywardena (UPFA), 67,510 pv; Buddhika Pathirana (UNF), 62,499 pv; Mangala Samaraweera (UNF-SLFP(P)), 59,836 pv; Chandrasiri Gajadeera (UPFA-CPSL), 51,742 pv; Hemal Gunasekara (UPFA), 51,013 pv; and Wijaya Dahanayaka (UPFA), 44,463 pv.

References

Electoral districts of Sri Lanka
Politics of Matara District